Rodrigo Antônio Lopes Belchior (born March 7, 1980) is a Brazilian footballer who plays for Rah Ahan F.C. in the Iran Pro League. He is married and has two children.

Club career

References

1980 births
Brasiliense Futebol Clube players
Brazilian expatriate footballers
Brazilian footballers
Expatriate footballers in Iran
Ipatinga Futebol Clube players
Living people
Paysandu Sport Club players
Rah Ahan players
Sertãozinho Futebol Clube players
Sociedade Esportiva do Gama players
Footballers from Brasília
Association football forwards